Zbigniew Turski (21 July 1908 – 6 January 1979) was a Polish composer. He was born in Konstancin and died in Warsaw. In 1948 he won a gold medal in the art competitions of the Olympic Games for his Symfonia Olimpijska ("Olympic Symphony").

Selected film music 
 The Nutcracker (1967 film)

References

External links
Profile 

1908 births
1979 deaths
20th-century composers
Polish composers
Chopin University of Music alumni
Medalists at the 1948 Summer Olympics
Olympic gold medalists in art competitions
Olympic competitors in art competitions
Recipients of the State Award Badge (Poland)